Northfield Public Schools (ISD 659) is a school district serving Northfield, Minnesota and surrounding areas. There are currently 3,940 students enrolled district-wide. Also, they are a Minnesota Department of Education approved charter school authorizer.

Schools

High schools
 Northfield High School
 Area Learning Center (alternative high school)

Middle schools
 Northfield Middle School

Elementary schools
 Bridgewater Elementary
 Greenvale Elementary
 Spring Creek Elementary

Other
 Longfellow School (contains early childhood learning center, Area Learning Center)

References 

School districts in Minnesota